Chris Alcock (born 24 June 1988 in Durban, South Africa) is a rugby union footballer. His regular playing position is openside flanker.

Alcock moved to Australia with his family at the age of 10. He attended Barker College in Sydney.

He made his senior debut during the 2010 Super 14 season for the New South Wales Waratahs against the Cheetahs and made a total of 25 appearances for the franchise before moving west to join the Force ahead of the 2013 Super Rugby season.

Super Rugby statistics

References 

1988 births
Living people
Australian rugby union players
Greater Sydney Rams players
New South Wales Waratahs players
People educated at Barker College
Perth Spirit players
Rugby union flankers
Rugby union players from Durban
South African emigrants to Australia
Western Force players